Sir William Robert Seymour Vesey-FitzGerald, GCSI, GCIE, PC (1818 – 28 June 1885), was an Anglo-Irish politician and colonial administrator. He served as Under-Secretary of State for Foreign Affairs between 1858 and 1859 and as Governor of Bombay between 1867 and 1872.

Background and education
FitzGerald was the illegitimate son of The 2nd Baron FitzGerald and Vesey. He was educated at both Christ Church, Oxford and Oriel College, Oxford, graduating with a degree in Classics in 1837.

Political career
FitzGerald was elected member for Horsham in 1848, but was unseated on petition. In 1852 he was once again elected for Horsham and was able to hold the seat until 1865. He served under The 14th Earl of Derby as Under-Secretary of State for Foreign Affairs between 1858 and 1859. 

In 1866 he was appointed Governor of Bombay, admitted to the Privy Council and (17 August 1887) made a Knight Commander of the Order of the Star of India, and Knight Grand Commander of the Order of the Indian Empire. 

On his return to Britain, he again represented Horsham in parliament from 1874 to 1875. In 1875, he was appointed Chief Charity Commissioner.

He married Maria Seymour, daughter of Edward Seymour, in 1840 and had a son and daughter.

See also
Baron FitzGerald and Vesey

References

Oxford Dictionary of National Biography

External links 
 

1818 births
1885 deaths
Members of the Parliament of the United Kingdom for English constituencies
Alumni of Oriel College, Oxford
Knights Commander of the Order of the Star of India
Knights Grand Commander of the Order of the Indian Empire
Members of the Privy Council of the United Kingdom
Governors of Bombay
UK MPs 1847–1852
UK MPs 1852–1857
UK MPs 1857–1859
UK MPs 1859–1865
UK MPs 1874–1880
Members of the Bombay Legislative Council
Eldest sons of British hereditary barons